Miguel "El Chino" Ximénez Acosta (born 13 September 1977 in Maldonado) is an Uruguayan former football striker.

Career

Sporting Cristal 
Miguel Ximénez was top goalscorer in the Torneo Apertura 2008 with 20 goals in 20 games playing for Sporting Cristal, also breaking Sergio Ibarra's record of 17 goals in a Torneo Apertura.

On October 26, 2008, Miguel Ximénez scored a hat-trick against José Gálvez FBC and broke Juan Cabellero's record of 29 goals in a single season with Sporting Cristal.

After a year with Club Libertad, Ximénez returned to Sporting Cristal for the 2010 season.

Universitario de Deportes 
In 2012, he signed a new contract in the Peruvian First Division with 20 goals in 20 games playing for  Club Universitario de Deportes. In the Peruvian 2013 Championship he won his first National title with Universitario de Deportes.

Honours

Club
Universitario de Deportes
 Torneo Descentralizado (1): 2013

References

External links
 Profile 
 

1977 births
Living people
People from Maldonado, Uruguay
Uruguayan footballers
Uruguayan expatriate footballers
Deportivo Maldonado players
Atenas de San Carlos players
Plaza Colonia players
Danubio F.C. players
Montevideo Wanderers F.C. players
Atlético Junior footballers
Sporting Cristal footballers
Club Libertad footballers
Club Universitario de Deportes footballers
Peruvian Primera División players
Paraguayan Primera División players
Categoría Primera A players
Uruguayan Primera División players
Expatriate footballers in Colombia
Expatriate footballers in Guatemala
Expatriate footballers in Paraguay
Expatriate footballers in Peru
Uruguayan expatriate sportspeople in Peru
Association football forwards